In ecology and biology, the Bray–Curtis dissimilarity, named after J. Roger Bray and John T. Curtis, is a statistic used to quantify the compositional dissimilarity between two different sites, based on counts at each site. As defined by Bray and Curtis, the index of dissimilarity is:

The index can be simplified to 1-2C/2 = 1-C  when the abundances at each site are expressed as proportions, though the two forms of the equation only produce matching results when the total number of specimens counted at both sites are the same. Further treatment can be found in Legendre & Legendre.

For a simple example, consider two aquariums:

Tank one: 6 goldfish, 7 guppies and 4 rainbow fish.

Tank two: 10 goldfish and 6 rainbow fish.

To calculate Bray–Curtis, let’s first calculate , the sum of only the lesser counts for each species found in both sites. Goldfish are found on both sites; the lesser count is 6. Guppies are only on one site, so they can’t be added in here. Rainbow fish, though, are in both, and the lesser count is 4.
So .

 (total number of specimens counted on site i) , and

 (total number of specimens counted on site j) . 

The Bray–Curtis dissimilarity is directly related to the quantitative Sørensen similarity index  between the same sites:

.

The Bray–Curtis dissimilarity is bounded between 0 and 1, where 0 means the two sites have the same composition (that is they share all the species), and 1 means the two sites do not share any species. At sites with where BC is intermediate (e.g. BC = 0.5) this index differs from other commonly used indices.

The Bray–Curtis dissimilarity is often erroneously called a distance ("A well-defined distance function obeys the triangle inequality, but there are several justifiable measures of difference between samples which do not have this property: to distinguish these from true distances we often refer to them as dissimilarities"). It is not a distance since it does not satisfy triangle inequality, and should always be called a dissimilarity to avoid confusion.

References

Further reading
 Czekanowski J (1909) Zur Differentialdiagnose der Neandertalgruppe. Korrespbl dt Ges Anthrop 40: 44–47.
 Ricotta C & Podani J (2017) On some properties of the Bray–Curtis dissimilarity and their ecological meaning. Ecological Complexity 31: 201–205.  
 Somerfield, PJ (2008) Identification of Bray–Curtis similarity index: comment on Yoshioka (2008). Mar Ecol Prog Ser 372: 303–306.
 Yoshioka PM (2008) Misidentification of the Bray–Curtis similarity index. Mar Ecol Prog Ser 368: 309–310. http://doi.org/10.3354/meps07728

Measurement of biodiversity